Mustoe is a surname. Notable people with the surname include:

Anne Mustoe (1933–2009), English cyclist and writer
Jordan Mustoe (born 1991), English footballer
Lyndon Mustoe (born 1969), Welsh rugby union player
Neil Mustoe (born 1976), English footballer
Richard Mustoe (born 1981), Welsh rugby union player
Robbie Mustoe (born 1968), English footballer, manager and commentator
William Robert Mustoe (1878–1942), English landscape gardener